Octomarginula arabica is a species of sea snail or limpet, a marine gastropod mollusk in the family Fissurellidae, the keyhole limpets and slit limpets.

References

 Vine, P. (1986). Red Sea Invertebrates. Immel Publishing, London. 224 pp.
 McLean J.H. (2011) Reinstatement of the fissurellid subfamily Hemitominae, with the description of new genera, and proposed evolutionary lineage, based on morphological characters of shell and radula (Gastropoda: Vetigastropoda). Malacologia 54(1–2): 407–427

External links

Fissurellidae
Gastropods described in 1852